Rhodopetoma renaudi is a species of sea snail, a marine gastropod mollusk in the family Pseudomelatomidae.

Description
The length of the shell attains 15.8 mm, its diameter 6 mm.

(Original description) The small shell is fusiform and turreted. The apex is blunt. The shell contains eight whorls. These are sharply angular, with an angle about two-fifths distance from the anterior margin of whorl. The upper and lower surfaces are flat.  About fifteen oblique nodes ornament the angle and extend down on the lower portion of the whorl, becoming obsolete before reaching the suture. The nodes become obsolete on the body whorl. The suture is deeply impressed and distinct. The 
aperture is short, elliptical and oblique. The posterior sinus is broad and shallow. The anterior sinus is long and  straight. The columella is incrusted within. The body whorl is angular, ventricose, much produced and narrow below, smooth, except for very faint incremental lines.

The species is distinguishable by the smooth, ventricose body whorl, sharply angulated whorls, nodose angle, and a long siphonal canal.

Distribution
This rare species occurs off California, USA. One specimen has been found from Pliocene strata and one (type) from lower San Pedro
series of Deadman Island.

References

 McLean J.H. (1996). The Prosobranchia. In: Taxonomic Atlas of the Benthic Fauna of the Santa Maria Basin and Western Santa Barbara Channel. The Mollusca Part 2 – The Gastropoda. Santa Barbara Museum of Natural History. volume 9: 1-160

External links
 

renaudi
Gastropods described in 1903